Hamid Jebelli (born ) is an Iranian stage and film actor and director.

He was born in Tehran, Iran. He has directed two films; Khab-e Sefid (White Dream) and Pesar-e Maryam (son of Mary). He is also the voice actor of Iranian famous puppet character, Kolah Ghermezi. His notable films as actor are: Mother, Del Shodegan, Kolah Ghermezi and Pesar Khaleh and Kolah Ghermezi and Bache Naneh.

Awards
His film, Son of Mary was chosen as the best film in Cairo Film Festival.

References

External links

Iranian male television actors
Iranian male voice actors
Iranian male stage actors
Iranian male film actors
Iranian film directors
Iranian screenwriters
Iranian male writers
Iranian puppeteers
People from Tehran
Living people
1958 births